Papingo (also transcribed as Papigko, Papigo) is a former community (1919-2010) in the Ioannina regional unit, Epirus, Greece. Since the 2011 local government reform (the so-called Kallikratis Law) it has become part of the municipality of Zagori, of which it is a municipal unit. The municipal unit has an area of 34.131 km2. It is located in the Vikos–Aoös National Park.

Papingo consists of two villages: Megalo Papingo (Greek: Μεγάλο Πάπιγκο) and Mikro Papingo (Greek: Μικρό Πάπιγκο), greater and lesser Papingo. There is a single road that provides access first to Megalo Papingo and a kilometre further to Mikro Papingo.

Geography

The village of Papingo is located very near the northern end of the Vikos Gorge and is inside the Vikos–Aoös National Park. It attracts many hikers and mountaineers from around the world. The Vikos Gorge is the largest canyon in Greece and arguably in all of Europe: it is the gorge with the greatest depth to width ratio, according to the Guinness Book of Records 1997. The village of Papingo is surrounded by deciduous forests and topped by the snowcapped Astraka peak of Mt Tymphe, that towers over the village. It has modest lodging provisions as well as tavernas serving traditional food, coffee, and spirits. 

The climate of the region is Mediterranean transitioning to Continental with heavy snowfalls in the winter and considerable rainfall and humidity also during the other seasons of the year. There is a very diverse flora and fauna, because of the many microenvironments, such as streams, rivers, lakes, forests, agricultural land, coppices, pasture, sub-alpine grassland and the unique biotope of the Vikos Gorge.

A footpath leads up from the village through the sub-alpine plateaus of Mt Tymphe to Drakolimni (Dragonlake), a glacial lake at an altitude of 2000 m. The trek to the lake lasts about 5 hours. Along the way, at an altitude of 1950 m, there is a mountain refuge, the Mountain Hut of Tymphe or of Astraka. It normally operates from May to October although it has solar panels that enable its use throughout the year. Use during the winter months can be arranged by appointment.

Another landscape attraction is a series of rock pools known as the Kolymbethres (Gr. term for "baptismal fonts") or the Ovires of Rogovos, which have been formed in the limestone by the so-called stream of Rogovos running down Mt Tymphe.

History
Papingo is first mentioned in a bull of Byzantine emperor Andronikos III Palaiologos from 1325. In 1399, the Greek population of great Zagori and Papingo joined the Despot of Epirus, Esau, in his campaign against various Albanian and Aromanian tribesmen. At the beginning of the 15th century, the Chronicle of the Tocco reports that Leonardo Tocco Leonardo was on hand to rescue the people of Papingo from a Turkish attack. After 1430 when the region came under Ottoman control Papingo became the capital of Zagori.

The village enjoyed a period of prosperity from the 15th to the 17th centuries due to the special privileges that the region of Zagori had secured from the Ottoman Sultan. Orthodox Albanians locally called "Arvanites", have settled in Megalo Papingo after the 15th century, later assimilating into the local population. Sarakatsani have settled in both Megalo and Mikro Papingo at the beginning of the 20th century.  During 17th-18th century various locals became folk healers, known as Vikos doctors, who used local herbs for various diseases.

A Greek school called the Kallineios School was built in 1780 with funds by Michael Anagnostopoulos, a wealthy expatriate living in the United States of America. The village's prosperity ended in the 19th C when the administrative privileges were withdrawn. A demographic decline ensued that continued through the 20th C, even after the union of Epirus with Greece following the Balkan Wars. There has been a small increase in the population of the two villages in recent decades, after they became a tourist attraction, especially following the Kallikratis Law project.

Buildings
The Kallineios School, founded in 1780, houses also the library of its founder, Michael Anagnostopoulos. Among the churches of Megalo Papingo, the church of Saint Blaise (Agios Blasios) dates from 1852 but is built on top of the foundations of an older church from 912. The church of St George (Agios Georgios) dates from 1774 and was renovated in 1880. The church of Panagia is also said to date from 1774. Outside Papingo near the main road that leads to the village is the Monastery of St Paraskevi (Agia Paraskevi), a Byzantine foundation. The 18th century church of the Archangels Michael and Gabriel (known also as the Taxiarchs) in Mikro Papingo has a wonderful wooden screen made by Epirotan craftsmen. It was originally the chapel of a monastery and its only remaining building.

Notable people from Papingo

Michael Anagnos or Michael Anagnostopoulos (1837–1906), philanthropist and director of Perkins Institution and Massachusetts Asylum for the Blind.
Georgios Anagnostopoulos (1884-1936), linguist.
Zacharias Sardelis (1830–1913), scholar and journalist.

Bibliography

References

External links

Populated places in Ioannina (regional unit)
Zagori